Measure for Measure (literally "A tooth for a tooth") is a 1943 Italian historical drama film  directed  by Marco Elter and starring Carlo Tamberlani, Caterina Boratto and Nelly Corradi. It is based on the William Shakespeare's  play of the same name.

Plot

Cast 
 
Carlo Tamberlani as  Angelo
Caterina Boratto as  Isabella
Nelly Corradi as Marianna
Loredana  as Giulietta
Memo Benassi as  Lucio
Osvaldo Genazzani as  Claudio
Alfredo Varelli as  Vincenzo 
Cesco Baseggio as  Schiumetta
Lamberto Picasso as  La Scala
Amelia Chellini as  Madama La Spanata
Claudio Ermelli  
Arturo Bragaglia  
Federico Collino  
Aldo Silvani 
Amalia Pellegrini

References

External links

Italian comedy films
1943 comedy films
Works based on Measure for Measure
Italian black-and-white films
Films scored by Giovanni Fusco
1940s Italian films